Kunar Cricket Ground is a cricket ground situated on the banks of the Kunar River at Asadabad in Kunar Province.

History
Construction of the ground was funded by a $100,000 grant by the Asian Cricket Council, with construction commencing in the middle of 2017, following protests in Asadabad over delays in the project. The ground held its inaugural first-class cricket match when it hosted a match between Amo Region and Band-e-Amir Region in the 2017–18 Ahmad Shah Abdali 4-day Tournament. To date the ground has hosted eighteen first-class matches, including for the Kunar Province cricket team. In a match between Kabul Region and Boost Region in the 2018 Ahmad Shah Abdali 4-day Tournament, Kabul batsman Shafiqullah scored the fastest double century in first-class cricket. He scored 200 not out from 89 balls, and also scored the most sixes in a first-class match, with 24, surpassing the previous record held by New Zealander Colin Munro.

Records

First-class
 Highest team total: 577 all out by Band-e-Amir Region v Kabul Region, 2017/18
 Lowest team total: 120 all out by Kandahar Province v Kunar Province, 2018/19
 Highest individual innings: 248 by Ihsanullah Janat for Mis Ainak Region v Boost Region, 2018/19

See also
List of cricket grounds in Afghanistan

References

External links
ESPNCricinfo

Cricket grounds in Afghanistan
Sports venues completed in 2018
Kunar Province